Georg Fahrenschon  (born 8 February 1968)  is a German politician, representative of the Christian Social Union of Bavaria. From 2008 to 2011 he served as finance minister in the Bavarian State Ministry of Finance. He was a member of the Bundestag of Germany until 2007.

Early life and education
Fahrenschon graduated with a Diplom in economics from the University of Augsburg in 1999.

Career

Member of the German Bundestag, 2002-2007
Following the 2002 federal elections, Fahrenschon became a Member of the German Bundestag, where he served on the Finance Committee. Within the Finance Committee, he was the CDU/CSU parliamentary group’s rapporteur on Germany's Transparency Directive Implementation Act (Transparenzrichtlinie-Umsetzungsgesetz, TUG), among others.

State Minister of Finance, 2008-2011
Following the Bavarian state elections in 2008, Fahrenschon was made State Minister of Finance in the cabinet of Minister-President Horst Seehofer. During his time in office, he led the talks with his Austrian counterpart Josef Proell in 2009 about Austria nationalizing Hypo Alpe-Adria-Bank International, a local unit of BayernLB, after heavy losses tied to loans in Southeast and Eastern Europe had driven the overextended lender to the brink of collapse.

In the negotiations to form a coalition government following the 2009 federal elections, Fahrenschon was a member of the working group on taxes, national budget and financial policy, led by Thomas de Maizière and Hermann Otto Solms.

In 2011, Fahrenschon presented a proposal envisaging tax cuts of 5 billion euros ($6.5 billion) for lower- and middle incomes by 2013, the year of the subsequent federal election; this move put him in conflict with federal Finance Minister Wolfgang Schäuble, who wanted to delay tax cuts to cut Germany’s budget deficit.

President of the German Savings Banks Association, 2012-2017
In October 2011, it became known that both Fahrenschon and Steffen Kampeter, Parliamentary State Secretary at the German Finance Ministry would be seeking the presidency of the DSGV after incumbent Heinrich Haasis stepped down.

In 2012, Fahrenschon led Germany’s savings banks in helping quash a proposal for Europe-wide deposit guarantees. He later sought to limit the remaining aspects of a European banking union, namely a joint resolution fund and central supervision of all the region’s lenders. Eventually, it was agreed that day-to-day supervision of all but one of the 417 Sparkassen – the largest, the Hamburger Sparkasse is the exception – would remain in German hands.

In November 2017, shortly before Fahrenschon was scheduled to stand for re-election for another six-year term, prosecutors in Munich charged Fahrenschon with tax evasion; he admitted to having filed his tax statements for 2012, 2013 and 2014 too late but denied the allegation and declined to pay a fine. Following internal and public pressure, he resigned from his post.

Personal life
Fahrenschon is married and has two daughters.

Other activities

Regulatory bodies
 Federal Financial Supervisory Authority (BaFin), Member of the Administrative Council (2012-2017)

Financial institutions
 European Savings Banks Group (ESBG), Member of the Board (2012-2017)
 Federal Association of Public Banks in Germany (VÖB), Member of the Board
 KfW, Member of the Supervisory Board, of the Remuneration Committee and of the Audit Committee
 DekaBank, Chairman of the Supervisory Board and Chairman of the Remuneration Committee
 Helaba, Member of the Supervisory Board and the Board of Public Owners 
 Berlin Hyp, Chairman of the Supervisory Board
 Landesbank Berlin Holding (LBB), Chairman of the Supervisory Board
 Landwirtschaftliche Rentenbank, Member of the Supervisory Board
 Giesecke & Devrient (G&D), Member of the Advisory Board 
 BayernLB, Chairman of the Supervisory Board (2008-2011)
 SaarLB, Member of the Supervisory Board (2007-2008)

State-owned companies
 Flughafen München GmbH, Chairman of the Supervisory Board (2008-2011)
 Messe München GmbH, Member of the Supervisory Board

Scientific institutions
 Medical Center of the Ludwig Maximilian University of Munich, Member of the Supervisory Board
 Max Planck Institute of Biochemistry, Member of the Board of Trustees
 Max Planck Institute of Neurobiology, Member of the Board of Trustees
 Max Planck Institute for Tax Law and Public Finance, Member of the Board of Trustees
 Munich School of Philosophy, Member of the Board of Trustees
 Ifo Institute for Economic Research, Member of the Board of Trustees

Others
 Cultural Foundation of the Federal States, Member of the Board of Trustees
 Deutsche Sporthilfe, Member of the Foundation’s Council
 Deutsches Museum, Member of the Supervisory Board
 Sparkassenstiftung für internationale Kooperation (Savings Banks Foundation for International Cooperation, SBFIC), Chairman of the Board of Trustees (2012-2017)
 Hochschule der Sparkassen-Finanzgruppe - University of Applied Sciences, Chairman of the Advisory Board (2012-2017)
  Goethe-Institut, Member of the Business and Industry Advisory Board
 Kulturkreis der deutschen Wirtschaft, Member of the Board of Directors
 Market Economy Foundation (Stiftung Marktwirtschaft), Member of the Political Advisory Board
 Forum Kapitalmarktinstrumente – Kapitalmarktfinanzierung, Member of the Advisory Board
 Ludwig Erhard Foundation, Member
 Munich Finance Forum, Member
 Stiftung Brandenburger Tor, Member of the Board of Trustees
 Schloss Neuhardenberg Foundation, Chairman of the Board of Trustees (2012-2017)
 Graf von Montgelas-Stiftung, Member of the Board of Trustees
 Central Committee of German Catholics (ZdK), Member

See also
List of Bavarian Christian Social Union politicians

References

1968 births
Living people
University of Augsburg alumni
German economists
Ministers of the Bavaria State Government
Members of the Bundestag 2005–2009
Members of the Bundestag 2002–2005
Members of the Bundestag for Bavaria
Members of the Bundestag for the Christian Social Union in Bavaria